Marlon Tucker (born 29 November 1960) is a Jamaican cricketer. He played in 29 first-class and 17 List A matches for the Jamaican cricket team from 1979 to 1990.

See also
 List of Jamaican representative cricketers

References

External links
 

1960 births
Living people
Jamaican cricketers
Jamaica cricketers
Sportspeople from Kingston, Jamaica